The 43rd United States Congress was a meeting of the legislative branch of the United States federal government, consisting of the United States Senate and the United States House of Representatives. It met in Washington, D.C. from March 4, 1873, to March 4, 1875, during the fifth and sixth years of Ulysses S. Grant's presidency. The apportionment of seats in the House of Representatives was based on the 1870 United States census. 

Both chambers had a Republican majority. This is the last time Republicans held a 2/3rds majority in the Senate.

Major events

 September 18, 1873: New York stock market crash triggered the Panic of 1873, part of the Long Depression
 November 4, 1874: United States House of Representatives elections, 1874 -Democrats regained control of the U.S. House of Representatives for the first time since 1860
 November 25, 1874: United States Greenback Party established as a political party, made primarily of farmers financially hurt by the Panic of 1873

Major legislation

 June 22, 1874: Revised Statutes of the United States
 June 23, 1874: Poland Act, 
 January 14, 1875: Specie Payment Resumption Act ch. 15, 
 March 1, 1875: Civil Rights Act of 1875, (Butler-Sumner Act) 
 March 3, 1875: Tariff of 1875
 March 3, 1875: Page Act of 1875,

Treaties 
March 18, 1874: Hawaii signed a treaty with the United States granting exclusive trading rights.

Party summary 

The count below identifies party affiliations at the beginning of the first session of this Congress, and includes members from vacancies and newly admitted states, when they were first seated. Changes resulting from subsequent replacements are shown below in the "Changes in membership" section.

Senate

House of Representatives
Before this Congress, the 1870 United States Census and resulting reapportionment changed the size of the House to 292 members.

Leadership

Senate 
President: Henry Wilson (R)
President pro tempore: Matthew H. Carpenter (R)
 Henry B. Anthony (R), elected January 25, 1875.

House of Representatives
Speaker: James G. Blaine (R)
 Republican Conference Chairman: Horace Maynard
 Democratic Caucus Chairman: William E. Niblack

Members
This list is arranged by chamber, then by state. Senators are listed by class and Members of the House by district.
Skip to House of Representatives, below

Senate
Senators were elected by the state legislatures every two years, with one-third beginning new six-year terms with each Congress. Preceding the names in the list below are Senate class numbers, which indicate the cycle of their election. In this Congress, class 1 meant their term ended with this Congress, facing re-election in 1874; class 2 meant their term began in the last Congress, facing re-election in 1876; and class 3 meant their term began in this Congress, facing re-election in 1878.

Alabama 
 2. George Goldthwaite (D)
 3. George E. Spencer (R)

Arkansas 
 2. Powell Clayton (R)
 3. Stephen W. Dorsey (R)

California 
 1. Eugene Casserly (D), until November 29, 1873
 John S. Hager (D), from December 23, 1873
 3. Aaron A. Sargent (R)

Connecticut 
 1. William A. Buckingham (R), until February 5, 1875
 William W. Eaton (D), from February 5, 1875
 3. Orris S. Ferry (LR)

Delaware 
 1. Thomas F. Bayard (D)
 2. Eli M. Saulsbury (D)

Florida 
 1. Abijah Gilbert (R)
 3. Simon B. Conover (R)

Georgia 
 2. Thomas M. Norwood (D)
 3. John B. Gordon (D)

Illinois 
 2. John A. Logan (R)
 3. Richard J. Oglesby (R)

Indiana 
 1. Daniel D. Pratt (R)
 3. Oliver H. P. T. Morton (R)

Iowa 
 2. George G. Wright (R)
 3. William B. Allison (R)

Kansas 
 2. Alexander Caldwell (R), until March 24, 1873
 Robert Crozier (R), November 24, 1873 - February 12, 1874
 James M. Harvey (R), from February 12, 1874
 3. John J. Ingalls (R)

Kentucky 
 2. John W. Stevenson (D)
 3. Thomas C. McCreery (D)

Louisiana 
 2. J. Rodman West (R)
 3: vacant

Maine 
 1. Hannibal Hamlin (R)
 2. Lot M. Morrill (R)

Maryland 
 1. William T. Hamilton (D)
 3. George R. Dennis (D)

Massachusetts 
 1. Charles Sumner (LR), until March 11, 1874
 William B. Washburn (R), from April 17, 1874
 2. George S. Boutwell (R), from March 17, 1873

Michigan 
 1. Zachariah Chandler (R)
 2. Thomas W. Ferry (R)

Minnesota 
 1. Alexander Ramsey (R)
 2. William Windom (R)

Mississippi 
 1. Adelbert Ames (R), until January 10, 1874
 Henry R. Pease (R), from February 3, 1874
 2. James L. Alcorn (R)

Missouri 
 1. Carl Schurz (R)
 3. Lewis V. Bogy (D)

Nebraska 
 1. Thomas Tipton (R)
 2. Phineas Hitchcock (R)

Nevada 
 1. William M. Stewart (R)
 3. John P. Jones (R)

New Hampshire 
 2. Aaron H. Cragin (R)
 3. Bainbridge Wadleigh (R)

New Jersey 
 1. John P. Stockton (D)
 2. Frederick T. Frelinghuysen (R)

New York 
 1. Reuben Fenton (R)
 3. Roscoe Conkling (R)

North Carolina 
 2. Matt W. Ransom (D)
 3. Augustus S. Merrimon (D)

Ohio 
 1. Allen G. Thurman (D)
 3. John Sherman (R)

Oregon 
 2. James K. Kelly (D)
 3. John H. Mitchell (R)

Pennsylvania 
 1. John Scott (R)
 3. Simon Cameron (R)

Rhode Island 
 1. William Sprague (R)
 2. Henry B. Anthony (R)

South Carolina 
 2. Thomas J. Robertson (R)
 3. John J. Patterson (R)

Tennessee 
 1. William G. Brownlow (R)
 2. Henry Cooper (D)

Texas 
 1. James W. Flanagan (R)
  2. Morgan C. Hamilton (LR)

Vermont 
 1. George F. Edmunds (R)
 3. Justin S. Morrill (R)

Virginia 
 1. John F. Lewis (R)
 2. John W. Johnston (D)

West Virginia 
 1. Arthur I. Boreman (R)
 2. Henry G. Davis (D)

Wisconsin 
 1. Matthew H. Carpenter (R)
 3. Timothy O. Howe (R)

House of Representatives
The names of members of the House of Representatives are preceded by their district numbers.

Alabama 
 . Frederick G. Bromberg (LR)
 . James T. Rapier (R)
 . Charles Pelham (R)
 . Charles Hays (R)
 . John H. Caldwell (D)
 . Joseph H. Sloss (D)
 . Charles C. Sheats (R)
 . Alexander White (R)

Arkansas 
 . Asa Hodges (R)
 . Oliver P. Snyder (R)
 . William W. Wilshire (R), until June 16, 1874
 Thomas M. Gunter (D), from June 16, 1874
 . William J. Hynes (LR)

California 
 . Charles Clayton (R)
 . Horace F. Page (R)
 . John K. Luttrell (D)
 . Sherman O. Houghton (R)

Connecticut 
 . Joseph R. Hawley (R)
 . Stephen W. Kellogg (R)
 . Henry H. Starkweather (R)
 . William H. Barnum (D)

Delaware 
 . James R. Lofland (R)

Florida 
 . Josiah T. Walls (R)
 . William J. Purman (R), until January 25, 1875

Georgia 
 . Morgan Rawls (D), until March 24, 1874
 Andrew Sloan (R), from March 24, 1874
 . Richard H. Whiteley (R)
 . Philip Cook (D)
 . Henry R. Harris (D)
 . James C. Freeman (R)
 . James H. Blount (D)
 . Pierce M. B. Young (D)
 . Alexander H. Stephens (D), from December 1, 1873
 . Hiram P. Bell (D)

Illinois 
 . John B. Rice (R), until December 17, 1874
 Bernard G. Caulfield (D), from February 1, 1875
 . Jasper D. Ward (R)
 . Charles B. Farwell (R)
 . Stephen A. Hurlbut (R)
 . Horatio C. Burchard (R)
 . John B. Hawley (R)
 . Franklin Corwin (R)
 . Greenbury L. Fort (R)
 . Granville Barrere (R)
 . William H. Ray (R)
 . Robert M. Knapp (D)
 . James C. Robinson (D)
 . John McNulta (R)
 . Joseph G. Cannon (R)
 . John R. Eden (D)
 . James S. Martin (R)
 . William R. Morrison (D)
 . Isaac Clements (R)
 . Samuel S. Marshall (D)

Indiana 
 . William E. Niblack (D)
 . Simeon K. Wolfe (D)
 . William S. Holman (D)
 . Jeremiah M. Wilson (R)
 . John Coburn (R)
 . Morton C. Hunter (R)
 . Thomas J. Cason (R)
 . James N. Tyner (R)
 . John P. C. Shanks (R)
 . Henry B. Sayler (R)
 . Jasper Packard (R)
 . Godlove S. Orth (R)
 . William Williams (R)

Iowa 
 . George W. McCrary (R)
 . Aylett R. Cotton (R)
 . William G. Donnan (R)
 . Henry O. Pratt (R)
 . James Wilson (R)
 . William Loughridge (R)
 . John A. Kasson (R)
 . James W. McDill (R)
 . Jackson Orr (R)

Kansas 
 . Stephen A. Cobb (R)
 . David P. Lowe (R)
 . William A. Phillips (R)

Kentucky 
 . Edward Crossland (D)
 . John Y. Brown (D)
 . Charles W. Milliken (D)
 . William B. Read (D)
 . Elisha D. Standiford (D)
 . William E. Arthur (D)
 . James B. Beck (D)
 . Milton J. Durham (D)
 . George M. Adams (D)
 . John D. Young (D)

Louisiana 
 . J. Hale Sypher (R), until March 3, 1875
 Effingham Lawrence (D), from March 3, 1875
 . Lionel A. Sheldon (R)
 . Chester B. Darrall (R)
 . George L. Smith (R), from November 24, 1873
 . Frank Morey (R)
 . George A. Sheridan (LR) from March 3, 1875

Maine 
 . John H. Burleigh (R)
 . William P. Frye (R)
 . James G. Blaine (R)
 . Samuel F. Hersey (R), until February 3, 1875
 . Eugene Hale (R)

Maryland 
 . Ephraim K. Wilson II (D)
 . Stevenson Archer (D)
 . William J. O'Brien (D)
 . Thomas Swann (D)
 . William Albert (R)
 . Lloyd Lowndes Jr. (R)

Massachusetts 
 . James Buffington (R)
 . Benjamin W. Harris (R)
 . William Whiting (R), until June 29, 1873
 Henry L. Pierce (R), from December 1, 1873
 . Samuel Hooper (R)
 . Daniel W. Gooch (R)
 . Benjamin F. Butler (R)
 . Ebenezer R. Hoar (R)
 . John M. S. Williams (R)
 . George F. Hoar (R)
 . Alvah Crocker (R), until December 26, 1874
 Charles A. Stevens (R), from January 27, 1875
 . Henry L. Dawes (R)

Michigan 
 . Moses W. Field (R)
 . Henry Waldron (R)
 . George Willard (R)
 . Julius C. Burrows (R)
 . Wilder D. Foster (R), until September 20, 1873
 William B. Williams (R), from December 1, 1873
 . Josiah Begole (R)
 . Omar D. Conger (R)
 . Nathan B. Bradley (R)
 . Jay A. Hubbell (R)

Minnesota 
 . Mark H. Dunnell (R)
 . Horace B. Strait (R)
 . John T. Averill (R)

Mississippi 
 . Lucius Q. C. Lamar (D)
 . Albert R. Howe (R)
 . Henry W. Barry (R)
 . Jason Niles (R)
 . George C. McKee (R)
 . John R. Lynch (R)

Missouri 
 . Edwin O. Stanard (R)
 . Erastus Wells (D)
 . William H. Stone (D)
 . Robert A. Hatcher (D)
 . Richard P. Bland (D)
 . Harrison E. Havens (R)
 . Thomas T. Crittenden (D)
 . Abram Comingo (D)
 . Isaac C. Parker (R)
 . Ira B. Hyde (R)
 . John B. Clark Jr. (D)
 . John M. Glover (D)
 . Aylett H. Buckner (D)

Nebraska 
 . Lorenzo Crounse (R)

Nevada 
 . Charles W. Kendall (D)

New Hampshire 
 . William B. Small (R)
 . Austin F. Pike (R)
 . Hosea W. Parker (D)

New Jersey 
 . John W. Hazelton (R)
 . Samuel A. Dobbins (R)
 . Amos Clark Jr. (R)
 . Robert Hamilton (D)
 . William W. Phelps (R)
 . Marcus L. Ward (R)
 . Isaac W. Scudder (R)

New York 
 . Henry J. Scudder (R)
 . John G. Schumaker (D)
 . Stewart L. Woodford (R), until July 1, 1874
 Simeon B. Chittenden (IR), from November 3, 1874
 . Philip S. Crooke (R)
 . William R. Roberts (D)
 . James Brooks (D), until April 30, 1873
 Samuel S. Cox (D), from November 4, 1873
 . Thomas J. Creamer (D)
 . John D. Lawson (R)
 . David B. Mellish (R), until May 23, 1874
 Richard Schell (D), from December 7, 1874
 . Fernando Wood (D)
 . Clarkson N. Potter (D)
 . Charles St. John (R)
 . John O. Whitehouse (D)
 . David M. De Witt (D)
 . Eli Perry (D)
 . James S. Smart (R)
 . Robert S. Hale (R)
 . William A. Wheeler (R)
 . Henry H. Hathorn (R)
 . David Wilber (R)
 . Clinton L. Merriam (R)
 . Ellis H. Roberts (R)
 . William E. Lansing (R)
 . R. Holland Duell (R)
 . Clinton D. MacDougall (R)
 . William H. Lamport (R)
 . Thomas C. Platt (R)
 . H. Boardman Smith (R)
 . Freeman Clarke (R)
 . George G. Hoskins (R)
 . Lyman K. Bass (R)
 . Walter L. Sessions (R)
 . Lyman Tremain (R)

North Carolina 
 . Clinton L. Cobb (R)
 . Charles R. Thomas (R)
 . Alfred M. Waddell (D)
 . William A. Smith (R)
 . James M. Leach (D)
 . Thomas S. Ashe (D)
 . William M. Robbins (D)
 . Robert B. Vance (D)

Ohio 
 . Milton Sayler (D)
 . Henry B. Banning (LR)
 . John Q. Smith (R)
 . Lewis B. Gunckel (R)
 . Charles N. Lamison (D)
 . Isaac R. Sherwood (R)
 . Lawrence T. Neal (D)
 . William Lawrence (R)
 . James W. Robinson (R)
 . Charles Foster (R)
 . Hezekiah S. Bundy (R)
 . Hugh J. Jewett (D), until June 23, 1874
 William E. Finck (D), from December 7, 1874
 . Milton I. Southard (D)
 . John Berry (D)
 . William P. Sprague (R)
 . Lorenzo Danford (R)
 . Laurin D. Woodworth (R)
 . James Monroe (R)
 . James A. Garfield (R)
 . Richard C. Parsons (R)

Oregon 
 . Joseph G. Wilson (R), until July 2, 1873
 James W. Nesmith (D), from December 1, 1873

Pennsylvania 
 . Samuel J. Randall (D)
 . Charles O'Neill (R)
 . Leonard Myers (R)
 . William D. Kelley (R)
 . Alfred C. Harmer (R)
 . James S. Biery (R)
 . Washington Townsend (R)
 . Hiester Clymer (D)
 . A. Herr Smith (R)
 . John W. Killinger (R)
 . John B. Storm (D)
 . Lazarus D. Shoemaker (R)
 . James D. Strawbridge (R)
 . John B. Packer (R)
 . John A. Magee (D)
 . John Cessna (R)
 . R. Milton Speer (D)
 . Sobieski Ross (R)
 . Carlton B. Curtis (R)
 . Hiram L. Richmond (R)
 . Alexander W. Taylor (R)
 . James S. Negley (R)
 . Ebenezer McJunkin (R), until January 1, 1875
 John M. Thompson (R), from January 5, 1875
 . William S. Moore (R)
 . Charles Albright (R)
 . Glenni W. Scofield (R)
 . Lemuel Todd (R)

Rhode Island 
 . Benjamin T. Eames (R)
 . James M. Pendleton (R)

South Carolina 
 . Joseph Rainey (R)
 . Alonzo J. Ransier (R)
 . Robert B. Elliott (R), until November 1, 1874
 Lewis C. Carpenter (R), from November 3, 1874
 . Alexander S. Wallace (R)
 . Richard H. Cain (R)

Tennessee 
 . Roderick R. Butler (R)
 . Jacob M. Thornburgh (R)
 . William Crutchfield (R)
 . John M. Bright (D)
 . Horace Harrison (R)
 . Washington C. Whitthorne (D)
 . John D. C. Atkins (D)
 . David A. Nunn (R)
 . Barbour Lewis (R)
 . Horace Maynard (R)

Texas 
 . William S. Herndon (D)
 . William P. McLean (D)
 . De Witt C. Giddings (D)
 . John Hancock (D)
 . Roger Q. Mills (D)
 . Asa H. Willie (D)

Vermont 
 . Charles W. Willard (R)
 . Luke P. Poland (R)
 . George W. Hendee (R)

Virginia 
 . James B. Sener (R)
 . James H. Platt Jr. (R)
 . J. Ambler Smith (R)
 . William H. H. Stowell (R)
 . Alexander Davis (D), until March 5, 1874
 Christopher Thomas (R), from March 5, 1874
 . Thomas Whitehead (D)
 . John T. Harris (D)
 . Eppa Hunton, II (D)
 . Rees Bowen (D)

West Virginia 
 . John J. Davis (ID)
 . John Hagans (R)
 . Frank Hereford (D)

Wisconsin 
 . Charles G. Williams (R)
 . Gerry W. Hazelton (R)
 . J. Allen Barber (R)
 . Alexander Mitchell (D)
 . Charles A. Eldredge (D)
 . Philetus Sawyer (R)
 . Jeremiah M. Rusk (R)
 . Alexander S. McDill (R)

Non-voting members
 . Richard C. McCormick (NU)
 . Jerome B. Chaffee (R)
 . Moses K. Armstrong (D)
 . Norton P. Chipman (R)
 . John Hailey (D)
 . Martin Maginnis (D)
 . Stephen B. Elkins (R)
 . George Q. Cannon (R)
 . Obadiah B. McFadden (D)
 . William R. Steele (D)

Changes in membership
The count below reflects changes from the beginning of the first session of this Congress.

Senate 
 Replacements: 5
 Democratic: 1 seat net gain
 Republican: no net change
 Liberal Republican: 1 seat net loss
 Deaths: 3
 Resignations: 3
 Interim appointments: 1
 Vacancy: 1
Total seats with changes: 7

|-
| Massachusetts (2)
| Vacant
| Henry Wilson resigned in previous congress after becoming Vice President of the United States.Successor elected March 17, 1873.
| nowrap  | George S. Boutwell (R)
| March 17, 1873

|-
| Mississippi (1)
| nowrap  | Adelbert Ames (R)
| Resigned March 17, 1873, after being elected Governor of Mississippi.Successor elected February 3, 1874.
| nowrap  | Henry R. Pease (R)
| February 3, 1874

|-
| Kansas (2)
| nowrap  | Alexander Caldwell (R)
| Resigned March 24, 1873.Successor appointed November 24, 1873.
| nowrap  | Robert Crozier (R)
| November 24, 1873

|-
| California (1)
| nowrap  | Eugene Casserly (D)
| Resigned November 29, 1873.Successor elected December 23, 1873.
| nowrap  | John S. Hager (D)
| December 23, 1873

|-
| Kansas (2)
| nowrap  | Robert Crozier (R)
| Interim appointee retired when successor elected February 2, 1874.
| nowrap  | James M. Harvey (R)
| February 2, 1874

|-
| Massachusetts (1)
| nowrap  | Charles Sumner (LR)
| Died March 11, 1874.Successor elected April 17, 1874.
| nowrap  | William B. Washburn (R)
| April 17, 1874

|-
| Connecticut (1)
| nowrap  | William A. Buckingham (R)
| Died February 5, 1875.Successor appointed February 5, 1875, having already been elected to the next tern.
| nowrap  | William W. Eaton (D)
| February 5, 1875

|}

House of Representatives 
 Replacements: 15
 Democratic: 3 seat net gain
 Republican: 4 seat net loss
 Liberal Republican: 1 seat net gain
 Deaths: 8
 Resignations: 5
 Contested election: 4
Total seats with changes: 19

|-
| 
| Vacant
| style="font-size:80%" | Rep-elect Samuel Peters died before taking seat
| nowrap  | George L. Smith (R)
| November 24, 1873
|-
| 
| Vacant
| style="font-size:80%" | Rep-elect Ambrose R. Wright died before taking seat
| nowrap  | Alexander H. Stephens (D)
| December 1, 1873
|-
| 
| nowrap  | James Brooks (D)
| style="font-size:80%" | Died April 30, 1873
| nowrap  | Samuel S. Cox (D)
| November 4, 1873
|-
| 
| nowrap  | William Whiting (R)
| style="font-size:80%" | Died June 29, 1873
| nowrap  | Henry L. Pierce (R)
| December 1, 1873
|-
| 
| nowrap  | Joseph G. Wilson (R)
| style="font-size:80%" | Died July 2, 1873
| nowrap  | James Nesmith (D)
| December 1, 1873
|-
| 
| nowrap  | Wilder D. Foster (R)
| style="font-size:80%" | Died September 20, 1873
| nowrap  | William B. Williams (R)
| December 1, 1873
|-
| 
| nowrap  | Alexander Davis (D)
| style="font-size:80%" | Lost contested election March 5, 1874
| nowrap  | Christopher Thomas (R)
| March 5, 1874
|-
| 
| nowrap  | Morgan Rawls (D)
| style="font-size:80%" | Lost contested election March 24, 1874
| nowrap  | Andrew Sloan (R)
| March 24, 1874
|-
| 
| nowrap  | David B. Mellish (R)
| style="font-size:80%" | Died May 23, 1874
| nowrap  | Richard Schell (D)
| December 7, 1874
|-
| 
| nowrap  | William W. Wilshire (R)
| style="font-size:80%" | Lost contested election June 16, 1874
| nowrap  | Thomas M. Gunter (D)
| June 16, 1874
|-
| 
| nowrap  | Hugh J. Jewett (D)
| style="font-size:80%" | Resigned June 23, 1874, after becoming President of the Erie Railroad 
| nowrap  | William E. Finck (D)
| December 7, 1874
|-
| 
| nowrap  | Stewart L. Woodford (R)
| style="font-size:80%" | Resigned July 1, 1874
| nowrap  | Simeon B. Chittenden (IR)
| November 3, 1874
|-
| 
| nowrap  | Robert B. Elliott (R)
| style="font-size:80%" | Resigned November 1, 1874
| nowrap  | Lewis C. Carpenter (R)
| November 3, 1874
|-
| 
| nowrap  | John B. Rice (R)
| style="font-size:80%" | Died December 17, 1874
| nowrap  | Bernard G. Caulfield (D)
| February 1, 1875
|-
| 
| nowrap  | Alvah Crocker (R)
| style="font-size:80%" | Died December 26, 1874
| nowrap  | Charles A. Stevens (R)
| January 27, 1875
|-
| 
| nowrap  | Ebenezer McJunkin (R)
| style="font-size:80%" | Resigned January 1, 1875
| nowrap  | John M. Thompson (R)
| January 5, 1875
|-
| 
| nowrap  | William J. Purman (R)
| style="font-size:80%" | Resigned January 25, 1875
| Vacant
| Not filled this term
|-
| 
| nowrap  | Samuel F. Hersey (R)
| style="font-size:80%" | Died February 3, 1875
| Vacant
| Not filled this term
|-
| 
| nowrap  | J. Hale Sypher (R)
| style="font-size:80%" | Lost contested election March 3, 1875
| nowrap  | Effingham Lawrence (D)
| March 3, 1875
|-
| 
| Vacant
| style="font-size:80%" | Contested election originally won by Pinckney Pinchback
| nowrap  | George A.Sheridan (R)
| March 3, 1875
|}

Committees

Senate

 Agriculture (Chairman: Frederick T. Frelinghuysen; Ranking Member: George R. Dennis)
 Appropriations (Chairman: Lot M. Morrill; Ranking Member: William B. Allison)
 Audit and Control the Contingent Expenses of the Senate (Chairman: Matthew H. Carpenter; Ranking Member: George R. Dennis)
 Civil Service and Retrenchment (Chairman: George G. Wright; Ranking Member: Timothy O. Howe)
 Claims (Chairman: John Scott; Ranking Member: George S. Boutwell)
 Commerce (Chairman: Zachariah Chandler; Ranking Member: George S. Boutwell)
 Distributing Public Revenue Among the States (Select)
 District of Columbia (Chairman: John F. Lewis; Ranking Member: John P. Jones)
 Education and Labor (Chairman: James W. Flanagan; Ranking Member: Oliver P. Morton)
 Engrossed Bills (Chairman: Thomas F. Bayard; Ranking Member: Henry Cooper)
 Finance (Chairman: John Sherman; Ranking Member: Thomas W. Ferry)
 Foreign Relations (Chairman: Simon Cameron; Ranking Member: Roscoe Conkling)
 Indian Affairs (Chairman: William A. Buckingham; Ranking Member: John J. Ingalls)
 Judiciary (Chairman: George F. Edmunds; Ranking Member: George G. Wright) 
 Manufactures (Chairman: Thomas J. Robertson; Ranking Member: Reuben E. Fenton)
 Military Affairs (Chairman: John A. Logan; Ranking Member: Bainbridge Wadleigh)
 Mines and Mining (Chairman: Hannibal Hamlin; Ranking Member: George Goldthwaite)
 Mississippi River Levee System (Select)
 Naval Affairs (Chairman: Aaron H. Cragin; Ranking Member: Simon B. Conover)
 Ordnance and War Ships (Select)
 Outrages in Southern States (Select)
 Patents (Chairman: Orris S. Ferry; Ranking Member: William T. Hamilton)
 Pensions (Chairman: Daniel D. Pratt; Ranking Member: Morgan C. Hamilton)
 Post Office and Post Roads (Chairman: Alexander Ramsey; Ranking Member: John P. Jones)
 Private Land Claims (Chairman: Allen G. Thurman; Ranking Member: Thomas F. Bayard)
 Privileges and Elections (Chairman: Oliver P. Morton; Ranking Member: John H. Mitchell)
 Public Buildings and Grounds (Chairman: Justin S. Morrill; Ranking Member: John J. Patterson)
 Public Lands (Chairman: William Sprague; Ranking Member: Bainbridge Wadleigh)
 Railroads (Chairman: William M. Stewart; Ranking Member: Timothy O. Howe)
 Removal of Political Disabilities (Select)
 Retrenchment
 Revision of the Laws (Chairman: Hannibal Hamlin; Ranking Member: James L. Alcorn)
 Revolutionary Claims (Chairman: William G. Brownlow; Ranking Member: John W. Johnston)
 Rules (Select)
 Tariff Regulation (Select)
 Territories (Chairman: Arthur I. Boreman; Ranking Member: John J. Patterson)
 Transportation Routes to the Seaboard (Select) (Chairman: William Windom; Ranking Member: John H. Mitchell)
 Whole

House of Representatives

 Accounts (Chairman: James Buffington; Ranking Member: Alexander S. Wallace)
 Agriculture (Chairman: Charles Hays; Ranking Member: Sobieski Ross)
 Appropriations (Chairman: James A. Garfield; Ranking Member: James N. Tyner)
 Alabama Affairs (Select)
 Arkansas Affairs (Select)
 Banking and Currency (Chairman: Horace Maynard; Ranking Member: Jay Abel Hubbell) 
 Claims (Chairman: John B. Hawley; Ranking Member: Julius C. Burrows)
 Coinage, Weights and Measures (Chairman: Samuel Hooper; Ranking Member: Horace B. Strait)
 Commerce (Chairman: William A. Wheeler; Ranking Member: Richard C. Parsons)
 District of Columbia (Chairman: Alfred C. Harmer; Ranking Member: Charles Pelham)
 Education and Labor (Chairman: James Monroe; Ranking Member: Alexander S. McDill)
 Elections (Chairman: Horace B. Smith; Ranking Member: Horace H. Harrison)
 Expenditures in the Interior Department (Chairman: Jackson Orr; Ranking Member: James C. Robinson)
 Expenditures in the Justice Department (Chairman: James B. Sener; Ranking Member: Robert M. Speer)
 Expenditures in the Navy Department (Chairman: Julius C. Burrows; Ranking Member: John A. Magee)
 Expenditures in the Post Office Department (Chairman: Henry W. Barry; Ranking Member: Pierce M. B. Young)
 Expenditures in the State Department (Chairman: Jasper Packard; Ranking Member: William R. Morrison)
 Expenditures in the Treasury Department (Chairman: J. Hale Sypher; Ranking Member: John G. Schumaker)
 Expenditures in the War Department (Chairman: William Williams; Ranking Member: John M. Bright)
 Expenditures on Public Buildings (Chairman: R. Holland Duell; Ranking Member: Henry O. Pratt)
 Freedmen's Affairs (Chairman: Clinton L. Cobb; Ranking Member: J. Allen Barber)
 Foreign Affairs (Chairman: Godlove Stein Orth; Ranking Member: William J. Albert)
 Indian Affairs (Chairman: John T. Averill; Ranking Member: John D. Lawson)
 Invalid Pensions (Chairman: Jeremiah McLain Rusk; Ranking Member: William B. Small)
 Judiciary (Chairman: Benjamin F. Butler; Ranking Member: Alexander White) 
 Manufactures (Chairman: Charles B. Farwell; Ranking Member: Laurin D. Woodworth)
 Mileage (Chairman: Hezekiah S. Bundy; Ranking Member: James W. Nesmith)
 Military Affairs (Chairman: John Coburn; Ranking Member: Clinton D. MacDougall)
 Militia (Chairman: Roderick R. Butler; Ranking Member: Josiah T. Walls)
 Mines and Mining (Chairman: David P. Lowe; Ranking Member: Christopher C. Sheats)
 Naval Affairs (Chairman: Glenni W. Scofield; Ranking Member: John H. Burleigh)
 Pacific Railroads (Chairman: Philetus Sawyer; Ranking Member: James W. McDill)
 Patents (Chairman: Omar D. Conger; Ranking Member: Henry B. Sayler)
 Post Office and Post Roads (Chairman: John B. Packer; Ranking Member: Stephen A. Cobb)
 Private Land Claims (Chairman: Jasper Packard; Ranking Member: James C. Freeman)
 Public Buildings and Grounds (Chairman: James H. Platt Jr.; Ranking Member: Lloyd Lowndes Jr.)
 Public Expenditures (Chairman: Harrison E. Havens; Ranking Member: Josiah W. Begole)
 Public Lands (Chairman: Washington Townsend; Ranking Member: William A. Phillips)
 Railways and Canals (Chairman: George W. McCrary; Ranking Member: Alexander W. Taylor)
 Reform on Civil Service (Chairman: Stephen W. Kellogg; Ranking Member: James D. Strawbridge)
 Revision of Laws (Chairman: Luke P. Poland; Ranking Member: William S. Moore)
 Revolutionary Pensions and War of 1812 (Chairman: Lazarus D. Shoemaker; Ranking Member: William Crutchfield)
 Rules (Select) (Chairman: James G. Blaine; Ranking Member: Samuel S. Cox)
 Standards of Official Conduct
 Territories (Chairman: George C. McKee; Ranking Member: Greenbury L. Fort)
 War Claims (Chairman: William Lawrence; Ranking Member: Abraham H. Smith)
 Ways and Means (Chairman: Henry L. Dawes; Ranking Member: Lionel A. Sheldon)
 Whole

Joint committees

 Conditions of Indian Tribes (Special)
 Enrolled Bills (Chairman: Rep. Chester B. Darrall; Vice Chairman: Rep. Henry R. Harris)
 Inquire into the Affairs of the District of Columbia (Select) (Chairman: Rep. Jeremiah M. Wilson; Vice Chairman: Rep. Hugh J. Jewett)
 The Library (Chairman: Rep. William P. Frye; Vice Chairman: Rep. Hiester Clymer)
 Printing (Chairman: Rep. William G. Donnan; Vice Chairman: Rep. Alfred M. Waddell)

Caucuses
 Democratic (House)
 Democratic (Senate)

Employees

Legislative branch agency directors 
Architect of the Capitol: Edward Clark
Librarian of Congress: Ainsworth Rand Spofford

Senate 
Chaplain: John P. Newman (Methodist), until December 8, 1873
 Byron Sunderland (Presbyterian), elected December 8, 1873
Librarian: George S. Wagner
Secretary: George C. Gorham
Sergeant at Arms: John R. French

House of Representatives 
Chaplain: John G. Butler (Presbyterian)
Clerk: Edward McPherson
Clerk at the Speaker’s Table: John M. Barclay
Doorkeeper: Otis S. Buxton
Postmaster: Henry Sherwood, elected December 1, 1873
Reading Clerks: Charles N. Clisbee (D) and William K. Mehaffey (R)
Sergeant at Arms: Nehemiah G. Ordway

See also 
 1872 United States elections (elections leading to this Congress)
 1872 United States presidential election
 1872–73 United States Senate elections
 1872–73 United States House of Representatives elections
 1874 United States elections (elections during this Congress, leading to the next Congress)
 1874–75 United States Senate elections
 1874–75 United States House of Representatives elections

Notes

References

External links
Statutes at Large, 1789-1875
Senate Journal, First Forty-three Sessions of Congress
House Journal, First Forty-three Sessions of Congress
Biographical Directory of the U.S. Congress
U.S. House of Representatives: House History
U.S. Senate: Statistics and Lists